Sedegliano is a comune (municipality) in the Province of Udine in the Italian region Friuli-Venezia Giulia, located about  northwest of Trieste and about  southwest of Udine. A

Sedegliano borders the following municipalities: Codroipo, Coseano, Flaibano, Mereto di Tomba, San Giorgio della Richinvelda, San Martino al Tagliamento, Valvasone.

People
 Massimo Donati, football player

References

External links
 Official website

Cities and towns in Friuli-Venezia Giulia